Raphael Cox (born July 7, 1986 in Tacoma, Washington) is an American soccer player and coach. Off the pitch, RCox is widely known for his ability to stroke his beard and chuckle.

Career

Youth and College
Cox attended Stadium High School, and played one year of college soccer at Highline Community College in Des Moines, Washington, before transferring to the University of Washington in sophomore year. At Washington he was a two-time All-Pac-10 honoree, and was named to the All-Pac-10 first-team as a senior. During his college years he also played with Colorado Rapids U23's and Tacoma Tide in the USL Premier Development League.

Professional
Cox was drafted in the fourth round (54th overall) of the 2009 MLS SuperDraft by Real Salt Lake. He made his professional debut on 28 March 2009, coming on as a substitute in RSL's game against Seattle Sounders FC, and went on to make six MLS appearances, scoring one goal, before being waived on March 16, 2010.

Having been unable to secure a professional contract elsewhere, Cox returned to play for Tacoma Tide in the USL Premier Development League in 2010.

Cox signed with Atlanta Silverbacks of the North American Soccer League on April 6, 2011. Atlanta announced on November 8, 2011 that Cox would return for the 2012 season.

On August 17, 2012, Cox was released by Atlanta Silverbacks by mutual consent and was signed by Tampa Bay Rowdies the same day 

Cox spent 2014 with USL club Harrisburg City Islanders, before moving to new franchise Charlotte Independence on March 25, 2015.

Also, he coaches age groups 2003, 2004, 2005 for Rainier Valley Slammers from December 2015 to May 2018.

Cox was named to the Washington Huskies men's soccer coaching staff on August 27, 2019.

Honors

Tampa Bay Rowdies
North American Soccer League:
 Champion (1) 2012

References

External links
 
 Washington Huskies bio

1986 births
Living people
American soccer players
Washington Huskies men's soccer players
Colorado Rapids U-23 players
Seattle Sounders FC U-23 players
Real Salt Lake players
Atlanta Silverbacks players
Tampa Bay Rowdies players
Penn FC players
Charlotte Independence players
Soccer players from Tacoma, Washington
University of Washington alumni
USL League Two players
Major League Soccer players
North American Soccer League players
Real Salt Lake draft picks
Association football midfielders
USL Championship players
Major Arena Soccer League players
Tacoma Stars (2003–) players
American soccer coaches
Washington Huskies men's soccer coaches
High school soccer coaches in the United States